Bojan Šejić  (Serbian Cyrillic: Бојан Шејић; born July 14, 1983) is a Serbian football goalkeeper who last played for Radnik Surdulica.

Honours
Radnik Surdulica
Serbian First League: 2014–15

References

External links
 
 Bojan Šejić stats at utakmica.rs

1983 births
Living people
Sportspeople from Niš
Association football goalkeepers
Serbian footballers
Serbian SuperLiga players
FK Zemun players
FK Radnički Niš players
FK Napredak Kruševac players
FK Laktaši players
FK Sloboda Užice players
FK Sloga Kraljevo players
FK Radnik Surdulica players